Private High School is a private high school in Kolhapur, India.

History
The school was established on 11 June 1883 by Vibhute Guruji i.e. Ramchandra Narsinha Kulkarni (विभुते गुरुजी) who was immensely inspired by the thoughts of Bal Gangadhar Tilak, Gopal Ganesh Agarkar and many others. Based on their principles and ideals, Guruji started his own private school to educate the younger generation of British-ruled India. Thus, it was named as "Private High School." At that time there was only one (British) government school in Kolhapur apart from Private High School. In 1919 the Private Education Society was founded.

Lokmanya Tilak visited the school in year 1900–01. The school started as a Marathi medium school. Today, it offers education in English and semi-English medium as well.

The School completed "Amrut Mahotsava" in 1985–86 and celebrated its 125th anniversary in 2009.

Administration
Private High-School is being managed by Private Education Society. The school is up to 10th standard in Marathi and Semi-English medium. The school comes under Maharashtra State Board of Secondary and Higher Secondary Education, Kolhapur division.

Notable alumni
 V. Shantaram
 Shri.S.S.Palsule Sir

References

Education in Kolhapur
High schools and secondary schools in Maharashtra
1883 establishments in India
Educational institutions established in 1883